Haithem Laamouz (born 4 November 1989) is a Maltese professional boxer. He has held the European Union super featherweight title since December 2020, and previously the OPBF junior welterweight title in 2017. As an amateur, he represented his country in the lightweight event at the 2009 World Championships.

Amateur career
Born and raised on the island of Malta, he began boxing at the age of 15. He also initially trained in mixed martial arts. He began training with former Commonwealth champion Scott Dixon in 2008. He represented his country at the 2009 World Championships in the lightweight event, where he lost his first match against 2016 Olympian Hu Qianxun. His first achievement was a gold medal in an England vs. Malta Club Tournament.

In 2010, he reached the quarter-finals of the Mohamed IV Tournament in Morocco, as well as the finals of the Haringey Box Cup in England. In 2012 he reached the finals of the Belfast Box Tournament in Belfast, where he lost to Seán McComb. He was also London Champion and a quarter-finalist in the England National Youth Championships. In 2013 and 2014 he won several tournaments in Sweden. He also defeated future Commonwealth featherweight champion Reece Bellotti in the finals of the 2014 Haringey Box Cup for his second consecutive title at the tournament.

He had dreams of qualifying for the Olympics but had no support from the Maltese federation. His amateur record was 52–10.

Professional career
Laamouz moved to Batemans Bay, Australia to pursue his professional career. He made his pro debut on 27 March 2015, defeating former Irish amateur champion Gearoid Clancy by split decision (SD) in Sydney. After winning his first five fights, he faced Will Sands at Sydney Olympic Park for the vacant New South Wales State light welterweight title. He knocked the Australian out in the seventh round to win his first belt. He defeated Fijian rival Sebastian Singh by unanimous decision to claim the WBA Asia light welterweight title in Sydney on 2 July 2016. On 26 March 2017 he won the vacant OPBF light welterweight title with a ten-round unanimous decision victory over Roy Tua Manihuruk.

He then moved down to lightweight, and challenged Joebert Delos Reyes for the vacant Australian title in July. He stopped Delos Reyes with a powerful left hook in the second round to add national champion to his résumé. After winning two non-title bouts, he lost the national title to Victorian state champion Gaige Ireland on St Patrick's Day in Sydney. Twelve months later Laamouz faced Italian two-time Olympian Vittorio Parrinello for the vacant WBC Mediterranean super featherweight title in Paola, Malta, beating him by unanimous decision to claim the belt and become Malta's first-ever WBC champion. He was originally schedule to face the lesser-known Benoit Manno, but he was replaced by Parrinello by the WBC after he failed to make weight.

Professional boxing record

References

External links
 

Living people
1989 births
Maltese male boxers
Super-featherweight boxers
Lightweight boxers
Light-welterweight boxers
Maltese expatriate sportspeople in Australia
People from Sliema